The Wallaceburg Red Devils are Junior "B" box lacrosse team from Wallaceburg, Ontario, Canada.  The Red Devils play in the OLA Junior B Lacrosse League and were 2001 Founders Cup National Champions.

History

The Wallaceburg Red Devils played their first season in the Summer of 1998.  At times, the Red Devils played some of their home games in the nearby Town of Walpole Island, Ontario.  Eventually they moved full time into the town of Wallaceburg.

2001 season
The Red Devils are best known for coming out of nowhere in 2001 to win the Founders Cup National title.  In 2001, the Red Devils were a true sleeper.  After their first three season, Wallaceburg was developing quite well as a lacrosse team but showed no real threat towards winning any championships.  They finished the regular season quite well with a 16-4-0 record, placing 2nd in the West.  In the first round of the playoffs, they defeated the Welland Warlords 3 games to none.  In the second round, they beat the Six Nations Red Rebels 4 games to 1.  In the Conference Final, they beat the powerhouse Elora Mohawks, who did not lose a regular season game, 3 games to 2.  In the series, the Mohawks actually beat the Devils 25-6 in Game 3, but when Elora forced a fifth and deciding game, both teams went the distance with the Red Devils coming out on top 12-11 in double overtime.  Both the Red Devils and Scarborough Saints (East Champions) moved on to the Founders Cup, the highest placing of the two would be presented the J.A. MacDonald Trophy as OLA Champions.

At the Founders Cup, in the round robin the Red Devils would beat the Poco Saints 17-6, Calgary Bandits 17-4, the Manitoba Falcons 19-10, and the Edmonton Miners 10-8 to finish first in Pool A.  In the crossover semi-final, the Red Devils defeated the Delta Islanders 11-5 to earn a birth into the national final.  With the win, as Scarborough lost their semi-final, the Red Devils were declared OLA MacDonald Trophy Champions.  In the final, the Red Devils again met Edmonton, this time beating them 10-5 to win the Founders Cup.

Goalie Josh McNaughton was named to the tournament all-star team, while Kevin Dostie was declared the most valuable player.

Since 2001
The Red Devils have a territorial rivalry with the nearby and much older Point Edward Pacers franchise.  In 2003, the Windsor Fratmen (now Windsor Clippers) and London Blue Devils joined the fray and the four teams formed the Far West Division in the Ontario Junior B Lacrosse League.  The four teams maintain an often heated and competitive rivalry.  Since 2003, the Clippers have led the way with 9 division titles, but neither London, Windsor, or Point Edward have won a Founders Cup since Wallaceburg's win in 2001.  The Red Devils also have a healthy rivalry with the Six Nations Rebels of Hagersville, Ontario as both teams are based in Native Reserve communities.

Season-by-season results

Note: GP = Games played, W = Wins, L = Losses, T = Ties, Pts = Points, GF = Goals for, GA = Goals against

Founders Cup
CANADIAN NATIONAL CHAMPIONSHIPS

References

External links
Red Devils Webpage
Unofficial OLA Page

Ontario Lacrosse Association teams